Maritza is a name of Spanish and German origin and may refer to:

Maritza Correia (born 1981), Puerto Rican swimmer
Maritza Olivares, Mexican actress
Maritza Rodríguez, Colombian actress
Maritza Salas (born 1975), Puerto Rican track and field athlete
Maritza Sayalero (born 1961), Venezuelan model and beauty pageant titleholder
Sari Maritza (1910–1987), English actress

See also
Maritsa, longest river that runs solely in the interior of the Balkans.
Maritsa Iztok Complex, Bulgarian power complex
Countess Maritza, English adaptation of  Hungarian operetta Gräfin Mariza